Federico Kirbus (14 October 1931 – 12 December 2015) was an Argentine journalist, writer, and  researcher.

He has published articles in publications such as Velocidad, El Gráfico, Motor, A Todo Motor, Aire & Sol, La Prensa, La Nación, Diario Clarín, Argentinisches Tageblatt, Autoclub, Automóvil Revue (Switzerland), Road & Track, Car and Driver (US), and many others. He has covered many races at home and abroad as a journalist, and toured with Juan Manuel Fangio in Europe; he joined the racing team Mercedes-Benz in 1955.

He ran as a writer of tourism much of Argentina and has "discovered" journalistically sites such as Ischigualasto (Moon Valley), Talampaya and Route 40. During his long activity was testing cars, a task performed for over half a century Marlu Kirbus with his wife (1940–2013).

In 1978, it prevented the Train to the Clouds, created shortly before it was suppressed for lack of passengers to be published in the official organ of the Automobile Club Argentino an article entitled "A clouds in a train", which made this tourist service known among many lovers of railways (Autoclub magazine). In 1983, he visited the Llanos of La Rioja and published in the journal Autoclub an article that would last for the public domain and tourism as "The Way of the Warlords"

Acknowledgments
Some of his awards throughout his career are:

1980 obtained a Mention Rolex Award by the First Foundation in Buenos Aires Escobar.
Takes in its honor the name "Sergeant Frederick" a hill of 6168 m located between summits and Peñas Blue Bonnet, in the great circle of volcanoes in the province of La Rioja, in latitude 27 ° S and longitude 68 57.6 44 5 W.
In 1987, he received a Certificate of Merit of the Konex Awards as one of the five popular science journalists most important of Argentina so far.

Publications
 The Life Story of Juan Manuel Fangio (1956)
 La Primera de las Tres Buenos Aires (1980) 
 Preparación de Motores de Competición (1975)
 Guía de Aventuras y Turismo (1982)
 El fabuloso Tren a las Nubes y otros ferrocarriles de montaña (1993)
 ARGENTINA, País de Maravillas (1993)
 Ruta Cuarenta y Mágica Ruta 40 (1994)
 Cordillera de los Andes y el fraude de las momias de los niños del Llullaillaco 
 Autobiografía 
 El Tesoro del Inca (1978).
 Enigmas, Misterios y Secretos de América (1977)
 Bombas Atómicas sobre Buenos Aires
 FLORENCIA, COLÓN Y EL DESCUBRIMIENTO (2010)

References

1931 births
2015 deaths
Argentine journalists
Male journalists
20th-century Argentine writers
20th-century Argentine male writers
21st-century Argentine writers
21st-century Argentine male writers
Burials at La Chacarita Cemetery